Sierra Leone has sent athletes to every Summer Olympic Games since 1968 with the exception of 1972 and 1976, but the nation has yet to win an Olympic medal. No athletes from Sierra Leone have competed in any Winter Olympic Games.

Medal tables

Medals by Games

See also
 List of flag bearers for Sierra Leone at the Olympics
 Sierra Leone at the Paralympics

External links